Winsnes is a surname. Notable people with the surname include:

Andreas Hofgaard Winsnes (1889–1972), Norwegian literary historian and educator
Arne Winsnes (born 1974), Norwegian footballer
Fredrik Winsnes (born 1975), Norwegian footballer
Johan-Petter Winsnes (born 1975), Norwegian footballer
Hanna Winsnes (1789–1872), Norwegian poet, novelist and cookbook writer